The giant Pacific octopus (Enteroctopus dofleini), also known as the North Pacific giant octopus, is a large marine cephalopod belonging to the genus Enteroctopus. Its spatial distribution includes the coastal North Pacific, along Mexico (Baja California), The United States (California, Oregon, Washington, and Alaska), Canada (British Columbia), Russia, Eastern China, Japan, and the Korean Peninsula. It is the largest octopus species, based on a scientific record of a  individual weighed live.

Etymology
The specific name dofleini was chosen by Gerhard Wülker in honor of German scientist Franz Theodor Doflein. It was moved to genus Enteroctopus by Eric Hochberg in 1998.

Description

Size
E. dofleini is distinguished from other species by its large size.

Ecology

Diet 
E. dofleini preys upon shrimp, crabs, scallop, abalone, cockles, snails, clams, lobsters, fish, squid, and other octopuses. Food is procured with its suckers and then bitten using its tough beak of chitin. Additionally, consumed carcasses of this same shark species have been found in giant Pacific octopus middens in the wild, providing strong evidence of these octopuses preying on small sharks in their natural habitat. In May 2012, amateur photographer Ginger Morneau was widely reported to have photographed a wild giant Pacific octopus attacking and drowning a seagull, demonstrating that this species is not above eating any available source of food within its size range, even birds.

Predators 
Scavengers and other organisms often attempt to eat octopus eggs, even when the female is present to protect them. Giant Pacific octopus paralarvae are preyed upon by many other zooplankton and filter feeders. Marine mammals, such as harbor seals, sea otters, and sperm whales depend upon the giant Pacific octopus as a source of food. Pacific sleeper sharks are also confirmed predators of this species. In addition, the octopus (along with cuttlefish and squid) is a significant source of protein for human consumption. About  are commercially fished, worth $6 billion annually. Over thousands of years, humans have caught them using lures, spears, pot traps, nets, and bare hands. The octopus is parasitized by the mesozoan , which lives in its renal appendages.

Lifespan and reproduction

The giant Pacific octopus is considered to be long-lived compared to other species, with lifespans typically 3–5 years in the wild. Many other octopuses go through a complete life cycle in one year, from egg to end of life. To help compensate for its relatively short lifespan, the octopus is extremely prolific. It can lay between 120,000 and 400,000 eggs which are coated in chorion, and attached to a hard surface by the female. The spawn is intensively cared for exclusively by the female, who continuously blows water over it and grooms it to remove algae and other growths. While she fulfills her duty of parental care the female stays close to her spawn, never leaving to feed, leading to her death soon after the young have hatched. The female's death is the result of starvation, as she subsists on her own body fats during this period of approximately 6 months. Hatchlings are about the size of a grain of rice, and very few survive to adulthood. Because they are cool-blooded, they are able to use most of their consumed energy for body mass, respiration, physical activity, and reproduction.
Large spermatophores are characteristic of octopuses in this genus. The female stores the spermatophore in her spermatheca until she is ready to fertilize her eggs. One female at the Seattle Aquarium was observed to retain a spermatophore for seven months before laying fertilized eggs.

Unlike males, only the female giant Pacific octopuses are semelparous, meaning they only breed a single time in their life. After reproduction, they enter a stage called senescence, which involves obvious changes in behavior and appearance, including a reduced appetite, retraction of skin around the eyes giving them a more pronounced appearance, increased activity in uncoordinated patterns, and white lesions all over the body. While the duration of this stage is variable, it typically lasts about one to two months. Death is typically attributed to starvation, as the females have stopped hunting in order to protect their eggs; males often spend more time in the open, making them more likely to be preyed upon.

Intelligence 
Octopuses are ranked as the most intelligent invertebrates. Giant Pacific octopuses are commonly kept on display at aquariums due to their size and interesting physiology, and have demonstrated the ability to recognize humans whom they frequently come in contact with. These responses include jetting water, changing body texture, and other behaviors that are consistently demonstrated to specific individuals. They have the ability to solve simple puzzles, open childproof bottles and use tools. The octopus brain has folded lobes (a distinct characteristic of complexity), visual and tactile memory centers. They have about 300 million neurons. They have been known to open tank valves, disassemble expensive equipment, and generally wreak havoc in labs and aquaria. Some researchers even claim that they are capable of motor play and having personalities.

Conservation and climate change

Giant Pacific octopuses are not currently under the protection of Convention on International Trade in Endangered Species of Wild Fauna and Flora or evaluated in the IUCN Red List. The giant Pacific octopus has not been assessed by the Monterey Bay Aquarium Seafood Watch, although other octopus species are listed. Combined with lack of assessment and mislabeling, tracking the species's abundance is nearly impossible. Scientists have relied on catch numbers to estimate stock abundance, but the animals are solitary and difficult to find. DNA techniques have assisted in genetic and phylogenetic analysis of the species' evolutionary past. Following its DNA analysis, the giant Pacific octopus may actually prove to be three subspecies (one in Japan, another in Alaska, and a third in Puget Sound).

In Puget Sound, the Washington Fish and Wildlife Commission adopted rules for protecting the harvest of giant Pacific octopuses at seven sites, after a legal harvest caused a public outcry. Populations in Puget Sound are not considered threatened.

Regardless of these data gaps in abundance estimates, future climate change scenarios may affect these organisms in different ways. Climate change is complex, with predicted biotic and abiotic changes to multiple processes including oxygen limitation, reproduction, ocean acidification, toxins, effects on other trophic levels, and RNA editing.

Oxygen limitation
Octopuses have been found to migrate for a variety of reasons. Using tag and recapture methods, scientists found they move from den to den in response to decreased food availability, change in water quality, increase in predation, or increased population density (or decreased available habitat/den space) Because their blue blood is copper-based (hemocyanin) and not an efficient oxygen carrier, octopuses favor and move toward cooler, oxygen-rich water. This dependency limits octopus habitat, typically to temperate waters . If seawater temperatures continue to rise, these organisms may be forced to move to deeper, cooler water.

Each fall in Washington's Hood Canal, a habitat for many octopuses, phytoplankton and macroalgae die and create a dead zone. As these micro-organisms decompose, oxygen is used up in the process and has been measured to be as low as 2 parts per million (ppm). This is a state of hypoxia. Normal levels are measured at 7–9 ppm. Fish and octopuses move from the deep towards the shallow water for more oxygen. Females do not leave, and die with their eggs at nesting sites. Warming seawater temperatures promote phytoplankton growth, and annual dead zones have been found to be increasing in size. To avoid these dead zones, octopuses must move to shallower waters, which may be warmer in temperature and less oxygen-rich, trapping them between two low-oxygen zones.

Reproduction

Increased seawater temperatures also increase metabolic processes. The warmer the water, the faster octopus eggs develop and hatch. After hatching, the paralarvae swim to the surface to join other plankton, where they are often preyed upon by birds, fish, and other plankton feeders. Quicker hatching time may also affect critical timing for food availability. One study found that higher water temperatures accelerated all aspects of reproduction and even shortened lifespan by up to 20%. Other studies concur that warming climate scenarios should result in higher embryo and paralarvae mortalities.

Ocean acidification

The burning of fossil fuels, deforestation, industrialization, and other land-use changes cause increased carbon dioxide levels in the atmosphere. The ocean absorbs an estimated 30% of emitted anthropogenic CO2. As the ocean absorbs CO2, it becomes more acidic and lowers in pH. Ocean acidification lowers available carbonate ions, which is a building block for calcium carbonate (CaCO3). Calcifying organisms use calcium carbonate to produce shells, skeletons, and tests. The prey base that octopuses prefer (crab, clams, scallops, mussels, etc.) are negatively impacted by ocean acidification, and may decrease in abundance. Shifts in available prey may force a change in octopus diets to other, nonshelled organisms.

Because octopuses have hemocyanin as copper-based blood, a small change in pH can reduce oxygen-carrying capacity. A pH change from 8.0 to 7.7 or 7.5 will have life-or-death effects on cephalopods.

Toxins
Researchers have found high concentrations of heavy metals and PCBs in tissues and digestive glands, which may have come from these octopus' preferred prey, the red rock crab (Cancer productus). These crabs bury themselves in contaminated sediments and eat prey that live nearby. What effects these toxins have on octopuses are unknown, but other exposed animals have been known to show liver damage, changes in immune systems, and death.

Effects on other trophic levels
Potential changes in octopus populations will affect upper and lower trophic levels. Lower trophic levels include all prey items, and may fluctuate inversely with octopus abundance. Higher trophic levels include all predators of octopuses, and may fluctuate with octopus abundance, although many may prey upon a variety of organisms. Protection of other threatened species may affect octopus populations (the sea otter, for example), as they may rely on octopuses for food. Some research suggests that fishing other species has aided octopus populations, by taking out predators and competitors.

RNA editing

Some octopuses exhibit the ability to alter speeds of sodium and potassium ion movement across cell membranes, allowing them to live in very cold water. Researchers at the University of Puerto Rico's Institute of Neurobiology have found that they have altered protein synthesis, and can speed up production of potassium channels in cold water to keep up with sodium ion exchange. They are now looking into whether individuals can alter their protein synthesis in response to changing temperatures, or if this change occurs species-wide, over long-term adaptations. If changes are possible by the individual, these octopuses might be able to adapt quickly to changing climate scenarios.

See also
Octopus wrestling
Cephalopod size
Squidward Tentacles, a fictional Giant Pacific octopus.

References

External links

The Cephalopod Page

Octopodidae
Molluscs of the Pacific Ocean
Marine molluscs of Asia
Cephalopods of North America
Molluscs of Japan
Fauna of California
Western North American coastal fauna
Molluscs described in 1910